Mount Harrington is an 11,009-foot-elevation (3,356 meter) mountain summit located in Fresno County of northern California, United States. It is situated on Monarch Divide which is west of the crest of the Sierra Nevada mountain range, in the Monarch Wilderness, on the shared boundary of Sequoia National Forest with Sierra National Forest. The first ascent of the summit was made July 27, 1951, by David Hammack and Anton Nelson.

Climate
According to the Köppen climate classification system, Mount Harrington is located in an alpine climate zone. Most weather fronts originate in the Pacific Ocean, and travel east toward the Sierra Nevada mountains. As fronts approach, they are forced upward by the peaks, causing them to drop their moisture in the form of rain or snowfall onto the range (orographic lift). Precipitation runoff from this mountain drains into tributaries of the Kings River.

See also

 List of mountain peaks of California

References

External links
 Weather forecast: Mount Harrington

Mountains of Fresno County, California
North American 3000 m summits
Mountains of Northern California
Sierra Nevada (United States)
Sierra National Forest
Sequoia National Forest